Sumgait is a city in Azerbaijan, located near the Caspian Sea, on the Absheron Peninsula, about  away from the capital Baku. The city has a population of around 345,300, making it the second largest city in Azerbaijan after Baku.

It was founded as a suburb of Baku in 1944 and received city status on November 22, 1949, growing into a major industrial center during the Soviet period. The municipality of Sumgait also includes the settlements of Jorat and Haji Zeynalabdin. It is home to Sumqayit State University.

Etymology 
According to local folklore the city is named after the Sumgait River. One folk legend tells the tale of a hero by the name of "Sum", who is chosen by the community to fight a monster that was blocking the Sumgait River. Sum eventually manages to kill the monster, but when the river is released he is swept away by the waters and never seen again. After that, his beloved, Jeyran, inconsolable due to Sum's disappearance, would go to the river and cry "Sum qayıt!" (which means "Sum, come back!" in Azerbaijani). So the river became known as Sumgait, after which the city was named.

History

Medieval era 
According to historians, Medean tribes lived in the area in ancient times. During the construction boom, when the foundation of the executive power building was being excavated, remains of an ancient caravanserai along with personal items and kitchenware was found at the site.

The first reports of settlements at the present site of Sumgait were in 1580, when English traveller H. Barrow mentioned Sumgait in his writings and in 1858, when Alexander Dumas wrote about the area in his memoirs Trip to Caucasus, although nothing substantial was created on the site until the Soviet Union gained control over the area in the 1920s.

Soviet period 
Following the politics of glasnost, initiated by Mikhail Gorbachev, civil unrest and ethnic strife grew in various regions of the Soviet Union, including Nagorno-Karabakh, an autonomous region of the Azerbaijani SSR.

The Sumgait pogrom against the local Armenian population on February 27-29, 1988 was one of the first violent events of the Nagorno-Karabakh conflict. It killed more than 30 people, wounded some 200, and produced thousands of refugees; most of the victims were Armenians who constituted a large minority of the population.

Republic era 
After the First Nagorno-Karabakh War, the city became home to a number of Azerbaijani refugees internally displaced persons, mainly from Qubadli and Zengilan regions. In 1994, Heydar Aliyev initiated a large-scale Free Economic Area project on the territory of the city.

Geography

Climate

Environment 
As a result of the Soviet planning of the industrial boom era, the city became heavily polluted. Soon after Azerbaijan's independence, the industrial sectors went into decline. The Absheron Peninsula (which consists of Sumgait, Baku and the Absheron District) was considered by scientists to be the most ecologically devastated part of Azerbaijan.  The city was known for its children's cemetery, known as the "Baby Cemetery" which contains many graves of infants born with deformities and mental retardation that were further complicated by the lack of adequate medical care for the poor. Sumgait was named as most polluted place on Earth by the U.S.-based environmental group the Blacksmith Institute in 2006 and placed on their list of The World's Most Polluted Places by Time magazine in 2007. The report noted the former Soviet industrial base was polluting the local environment with industrial chemicals like chlorine and heavy metals. The report also mentioned cancer rates in Sumgait were as much as 51% higher than the national average and that genetic mutations and birth defects were commonplace.
The city administration prepared an environmental protection plan for 2003–2010 which has been steadily decreasing the levels of pollution to minimal. The program oversees 118 activities aimed at minimizing pollution at all possible levels of economic production. The program was prepared with the participation of all industrial enterprises in the city and its enforcement is being regulated by the executive power of the city. Solid waste went down from 300,000 to 3,868 tons a year. The World Bank has issued a loan to the Azerbaijani government for construction of a burial range for mercury waste.

Administrative divisions 

The municipality of Sumgait consists of the city of Sumgait and the municipalities of Jorat and Haji Zeynalabdin. Executive power in the city is held by the mayor, presently Zakir Ferejov.

Demographics 
According to the State Statistics Committee, as of 2018, the population of city was 341,200 people, having increased by 84,500 (about 33 percent) from 256,700 peple in 2000. The population consists of 168,300 men and 172,900 women.  More than 23 percent of the population consists of young people and teenagers aged 14–29.

Ethnic composition
Azerbaijanis comprise 85% of the population, Talysh 5%, Lezgins 5%, Russians 2%, Turkish 1%, and others 2%. Prior to February 1988, Sumgait was home to 20,000 Armenians, who were displaced as a result of the Sumgait pogrom.

Religion 
Sumgait did not have a mosque until after the collapse of the Soviet Union. In the 2010s, the city emerged as a center for Salafism in Azerbaijan, a form of Sunni Islam that advocates a return to Islam's earliest practices. The Syrian Civil War and emergence of ISIL forced authorities to take action on crackdown of perceived religious radicals in Sumgait.

Economy 

In 1935, the Soviet government decided to develop heavy industry in the Absheron Peninsula, and the future location of Sumgait was chosen based on its proximity to Baku and its key position on the existing railroad lines.

Between 1938 and 1941, a thermal power station was constructed to power Baku's growing petroleum industry.  This was soon followed by more heavy industries. Due to World War II the construction of the area stopped and resumed in 1944 when metallurgical and chemical plants were constructed and put into operation. The first production of Sumgait Chemical Plant led to a rapid growth and construction boom, creating a new job market, and a need for a resident population. In 1949, Sumgait gained official city status according to the resolution of the Supreme Soviet of Azerbaijan SSR. In 1952, a tube-rolling plant delivered its first produce thus developing black metallurgy production in Azerbaijan. The same year, another new Synthetic Rubber Production Plant started its operations producing ethylene obtained from oil. Operations at Sumgait Steel Processing Plant and Sumgait Aluminium Plant were commenced in 1953 and 1955, respectively. In 1957–1955, a number of scientific research facilities and cultural centres were built, leading to further development of the city infrastructure. In 1960, authorities started building the Petroleum Chemical Factory, the largest in Europe at the time. From 1961 through 1968, a brick-producing factory, a polymer construction materials industrial complex, a phosphor production plant were built. In the 1970–80s, light industry and mechanical engineering facilities were added to the industrial base of the city. By the end of the 1980s, Sumgait was already the centre of the chemical industry of the USSR.

After the dissolution of the Soviet Union, Sumgait has remained Azerbaijan's second-biggest industrial centre after Baku. Some of the most significant companies operating in the city are Azerpipe, Azeraluminium, Sumgait Aluminium, Sumgait Superphosphate, glass producer Khazar OJSC, Sumgait Knitted Goods Factory, and Sumgait Compressors, many of which have been privatized.

In 2011, the development of Sumgait Technologies Park (STP) and Sumgayit Chemical Industrial Park (SCIP) started to receive investor attention. The  complex will host pharmaceutical, construction, and agricultural businesses, in addition to chemical, automotive, and electronics producers. It is meant as a self-sufficient complex, which will include residential facilities, an exhibition center, laboratories, sports center, schools, and hospitals. SCIP aims to attract domestic and foreign investors, and its management has already received proposals for 20 investment projects in the complex.

Culture

Architecture

The first studies in architecture and urban planning of the city of Sumgait were carried out by Azerbaijani and Soviet scientist, academician of the International Academy of Architecture of the Eastern Countries, honored architect of Azerbaijan SSR Kamal Mammadbeyov. The result of years of research were numerous scientific publications and a book about architectural and planning development of the city of Sumgait. Mammadbeyov donated a large number of graphics and illustrations made by him to the archives of The City Museum. The Flag Museum in Sumgait was opened on December 15, 2017, with the participation of Ilham Aliyev.

Music and media 
Sumgait was credited as the main regional driving force behind rock bands of the 1990s including Yuxu, Miraj, Mozalan, and Sirr.

The regional channel Dünya TV and newspaper 365 Gün are headquartered in the city.

In 2020, the Azerbaijan Jewish Media Center was established in Sumgayit.

Parks and gardens 

During the Soviet rule of Azerbaijan, Sumgait was believed to have the longest boulevard in the republic. On August 17, 1978, the park was given the name of a distinguished Azerbaijani poet Imadaddin Nasimi. The same year, the city administration raised the Peace Dove sculpture and monument in the middle of the park assigning the city a symbol of peace.

The flora of the park includes 39 types of trees. Events of the 1990s, such as the Black January tragedy and First Nagorno-Karabakh War, led to the establishment of Stars (Ulduzlar) and 20 January Monument monuments in the park. In the eastern section of the park, Shehidler Khiyabani, similar to Martyrs' Lane in Baku, was established as a burial ground for thousands of soldiers from Sumgait who died during the war. According to Decree No. 132 of the Cabinet of Ministers of Azerbaijan dated August 2, 2001, the park was given the status of national historical importance. Its current size is 80 ha.

In addition to Nasimi Culture and Leisure Park, the city administration built Ludwigshafen Park in 1997 in celebration of the 20th anniversary of twin-city relations between Ludwigshafen and Sumgait. In 1999, Heydar Aliyev Park and Luna Park were built in the rapidly growing city.

Sports 

The city has one professional football team competing in the top-flight of Azerbaijani football – Sumgayit, currently playing in the Azerbaijan Premier League.

Transportation

Public transport 
The city had a tram system that functioned from 1959 to 2003. Sumgait's trolleybus system at its height, it consisted of eight lines and existed until 2006.
On June 3, 2015, in Baku, President of Azerbaijan Ilham Aliyev opened the reconstructed Baku-Sumgait Railway with trains taking 40 minutes from Baku to Sumgait.

Education 
, Sumgait boasted 49 schools, 13 vocational and music schools, Sumgait Private Turkish High School and a teachers' institute.

The only university in the city is Sumqayit State University. The university has seven departments and approximately 4000 students.

Notable natives 

The city's notable residents include the following people.

International relations

Twin towns and sister cities 
Sumgait is twinned with the following cities:

 Rustavi, Georgia, (since 1952)
 Cherkasy, Ukraine, (since 1972)
 Pitești, Romania, (since 1971)
 Ludwigshafen, Germany, (since 1977)
 Bari, Italy, (since 2004)
 Aktau, Kazakhstan, (since 2009)
 Mogilev, Belarus, (since 2009)
 Nevinnomyssk, Russia, (since 2011)
 Genoa, Italy, (since 2013)
 Zhuzhou, China
 Ceyhan, Turkey

References

External links 

Sumqayıt Şəhər İcra Hakimiyyətinin rəsmi İnternet saytı
Sumqayıt Təhsil Şöbəsi  
Sumqayıt Xəbər 
Sumgait foto video galereya
Sumqayit forum
Sumqayit Companies 
Browse hotels in Sumqayit 

Populated places in Azerbaijan
Districts of Azerbaijan
Port cities in Azerbaijan
Cities and towns built in the Soviet Union
Populated places on the Caspian Sea
1949 establishments in Azerbaijan
Populated places established in 1949